The Penthouse is a 1967 British satirical drama thriller film directed by Peter Collinson. It stars Terence Morgan and Suzy Kendall and was based on a 1964 play The Meter Man by Scott Forbes.

Plot
Bruce Victor (Terence Morgan), a real estate agent, is a married man having an affair with Barbara (Suzy Kendall). They are staying in a penthouse apartment that they've rented.

One morning, two men, Tom and Dick (Tony Beckley and Norman Rodway, respectively), who claim to be meter men and that Harry is downstairs, arrive but Barbara then realizes that they are thieves when they tie Bruce up to a chair. When she screams for help, they violate her with drugs and alcohol. Barbara then performs a striptease for them and Dick later has sex with her.

After Tom and Dick finally leave, Harry (Martine Beswick), a woman, who claims to be Tom and Dick's parole officer, arrives and brings them back up to make them apologize for what they did. However, the three then tie them both up to a chair and threaten them not to tell anyone. But the two manage to untie themselves.

The film ends with Barbara and Bruce leaving the building, parting ways and walking off into the night.

Cast
 Terence Morgan as Bruce Victor
 Suzy Kendall as Barbara Willison
 Tony Beckley as Tom
 Norman Rodway as Dick
 Martine Beswick as Harry

Production
The film was the directorial debut of Peter Collinson who would work again with the film's star Suzy Kendall in Up the Junction (1968). He would also work again with Tony Beckley in The Long Day's Dying (1968) and The Italian Job (1969).

Filming
The film was shot at Twickenham Studios with sets designed by the art director Peter Mullins. The exterior shots of the high-rise apartment building were shot at the Wembley Point in London.

Music
The song  heard during the end credits "The World Is Full of Lonely Men", is sung by Lisa Shane with music and lyrics by Johnny Hawksworth and Hal Shaper, respectively.

References

External links
 
 
 

1967 films
Films directed by Peter Collinson
British films based on plays
British thriller films
1960s thriller films
Paramount Pictures films
Home invasions in film
Films set in London
Films shot at Twickenham Film Studios
1967 directorial debut films
1960s English-language films
1960s British films